"Gila Lah!" or "Gilalah"  (translation: "Crazy!") is a song written by Stacy and produced by Omar K. and Mike Chan for her third album, "#1" (2014). It was released on 15 May 2014 as the lead single from the album.

Composition 
Lyrically the song tells about how Stacy is living her "crazy" life and how she is as a person. The song is a dance-pop song. Stacy also mentioned her adopted daughter Bella in this song. This song is also her first attempt on writing songs after being challenged by long-time friend and producer Omar K. She wrote the song in two hours.

Music video 
The music video of this song was released on 15 May 2014, making its television debut on Era FM MeleTOP. The video was also directed by her. The video has been viewed more than 1 million times on YouTube.

Chart performances 
The song was a commercial success for Stacy, peaking at No.23 on Era 40, No.3 on Hot.fm, and No.1 on Muzik Muzik Chart. The song also advanced to final round of Anugerah Juara Lagu 29.

References

External links

2014 singles
Dance-pop songs
Warner Music Group singles
Stacy (singer) songs
2014 songs